The UAAP Cheerdance Competition is an annual one-day event of the University Athletic Association of the Philippines for cheerdancing. The sequence of the performance are determined by drawing of lots prior the competition.

Before the announcement of winners and after all squads have performed, a recap is shown during the telecast. Only the Top 3 are announced at the end of the competition. The tally sheet of the total number of points garnered by all squads will be posted on social media briefly after the announcement of the top three. The 2015 UAAP Cheerdance Competition currently stands as the most attended collegiate sporting event in both the UAAP and across the Philippines, with a record-breaking 25,388 paying audience.

Participants

Rules
The competition rules has been revised through the years since it began. The following is based on the most recent rules drafted in 2012.

Basic rules
 One official team per UAAP-member university
 15-25 UAAP-eligible students
 Max of 5 spotters and propsmen, in all-black garb
 Up to 2 substitutes 12 hours before the main competition
 No interaction between members of the panel judges and participants, coaches and spectators 
 No abusive and profane language 
 No inappropriate and disrespectful action

Performance
 Routines must have
 School cheer yelled live. Any stunt, pyramid, and tumbling done during the cheer routine will be judged under the cheer category of each element.
 Dance Routine (50% of total score)
 Stunts (Lifts and Dismounts)
 Tosses 
 Pyramids (minimum of 3 pyramids with a maximum of 2.5 high)
 Tumblings (standing and running)
 Maximum of 7 snares and 12 bass drums if the venue is Smart Araneta Coliseum; 5 snares and 6 bass drums if the venue is SM Mall of Asia Arena
 Cheerleaders prohibited to be outside the boundary line of 15x20 meters performance area during the performance period
 Performance must be 4–5 minutes long
 Time will be stopped once all cheer dancers are no longer in the 15x20 meter performance area

Judges
Prior 1990, the panel of judges compose of representative from 8 UAAP-member schools and a representative from a credible gymnastics organizations. In 2009, UAAP replaced the panel of judges with specialist from various cheerleading, dance, and gymnastics organizations.

In 2019, a different way of composing the panel of judges was made by a Presiding Judge. A single judge was assigned in every element in the cheerleading criteria. For the dance criteria, two or five judges were tasked to judge this particular criteria.

Criteria
The criteria for judging varies year-on-year. In 2008, the criteria were changed to a more cheerleading-focused point-system, giving a maximum score for each element of cheerleading and/or dancing. For 2013 edition, the criteria were divided into two: cheerleading and dance criteria. Cheerleading criteria were sub-divided into four elements (tumbling, stunt, tosses, and pyramid) with a maximum of 100 points for each element, while the dance criteria, which had a maximum of 100 points per number of judges for dance, were subdivided into four sub-criteria (over-all effectiveness, choreography, technique and execution).

Sponsors

Results
Every season, the host school for the UAAP Cheerdance Competition may or may not be different from the league's season host school.

Notes:
  - The UAAP Board suspended the competition when a member from the UP Filipiniana figured in an accident during practice.
  - In 1998, UST Salinggawi Dance Troupe did not join the competition because of injured members.
  - De La Salle University was suspended from the league in 2006.
  - Instead of the average score from the five judges, the ranking frequency system was used in ranking and declaring the winners for 2012 UAAP Cheerdance Competition. In the case of NU and UST, NU was declared as the 2nd runner up as 3 out of 5 judges voted for NU as the 3rd placer while 3 out of 5 judges voted for UST as the 4th placer despite of the higher score of UST (85.56) than NU (85.16)
  - Merit-based scoring was used in the criteria: 400 points for cheerleading elements and 400 points for dance elements; for a total score of 800. Scores displayed here are its percentage equivalent (e.g. Actual Score divided by 800 then multiplied to 100).
  - University of the Philippines skipped UAAP Season 79 Cheerdance Competition
  - The Far Eastern University and the National University finished the competition tied in the fourth place.
  - In the 2nd Quarter of 2020 the remainder of the UAAP Season 82 was scrapped due to the COVID-19 Pandemic. This canceled the 83rd Season as a whole in mid 2020 and the rest of 2021,
  - UAAP Season 84 was scheduled to begin in 2021, but due to the COVID-19 Pandemic the UAAP Board of Trustees decided to begin the season in March 2022. The UAAP Cheerdance Competition was held on May 22, 2022
  - A new set of rules were applied to fit the COVID-19 Safety Protocols stated by the IATF
  - The original rules and regulations were reinstituted. A total of 15-25 performers were allowed to perform and execute a 5- to 6-minute routines.

Group Stunts Division
History

In 2011, UAAP introduced the Group Stunts Competition hosted by Ateneo. Six teams performed on the inaugural group stunts division: UP, Ateneo, FEU, UST, NU and Adamson.

In 2012, La Salle joined the group stunts for the first time while Ateneo didn't participate on the group stunts competition until 2019. UE joined the group stunts competition in 2014.

In 2014, 2017 (UE performed that year but not included in the competition.) and 2018, only Ateneo did not join the competition.

In 2019, Ateneo returned to the competition since last competing in 2011, while La Salle didn't participate on the same year.

No Group Stunts Competition held in 2020-2022. Group stunts will return on Season 86 (2023).

General Rules of the Group Stunts Division:

This is the most recent draft of the rules implemented since 2011.

1. Must be maximum of 5 members (with atleast 2 flyers, Recommended: 3 men and 2 women) and a maximum of 2 spotters per team.

2. Competing teams must perform within the competition mat during the duration of the performance.

3. Minimum of 45 seconds and a maximum of 60 seconds) 1 minute per routine. Excluding Entrance and Exit, the timer will start on the first second of the music.

4. All skills performed must be legal and within the guidelines of the rules of the competition specified and complement to the rule book. Failure to comply may result to disqualification.

5. Judges decision is final and irrevocable unless reviewed by the board for clarification.

Table of Results of Group Stunts Division

Notes:

National University (NU)  won the most number of titles (4) including back-to-back titles in 2018-2019. 

Far Eastern University (FEU) won 2 times in 2014 and 2017 and has the longest consecutive podium finish since the start of Group Stunts competition in 2011.

UP won the first two competitions in 2011 and 2012. UP didn't join in 2016 and the most recent podium finish is 3rd place in 2017.

UST won 1 title in 2015 Group Stunts Competition and has a 4 consecutive podium streak in 2013 to 2016.

Adamson's highest place in Group Stunts was in 2017 when they placed 2nd behind FEU. Adamson is currently 3rd in the last 2 editions of group stunts competition (2018 and 2019).

UE placed 4th two times (2018-2019) and has yet to place in the podium in Group Stunts division. UE participated in 2014, 2016, 2018 and 2019. UE performed a routine in 2017 but not included on the competition.

La Salle and Ateneo has yet to place in the Group Stunts Division. La Salle only competed in 2012-2015, 2017 and 2018 while Ateneo competed in 2011 and 2019.

Currently only NU, FEU, Adamson and UST competed in all of the editions of the Group Stunts Competition.

Other Awards

Stunner Awardees

Corporate Awards

Championship Table

Cheerdance Competition

Note: Season 84 (2021-2022) was held on March 2022.

Group Stunts Competition

Note: No Group stunts competition held in 2020-2022.

Trivias and fun facts

UP–UST rivalry

The cheerdance rivalry between UP and UST is one of the most productive rivalries in UAAP history, producing a total of 15 years of joint UP-UST appearances in the podium finishes, including a decade-long streak of joint medal finishes from 1999 to 2008.

The UST Salinggawi Dance Troupe won the first three years of competition from 1994 to 1996. During those years, UP used to send its own dance troupe, the UP Filipiniana Dance Troupe and in the first edition of the contest, UP did not make it to the top three while the UST Salinggawi Dance Troupe reigned supreme. In the 1998 season, UST Salinggawi Dance Troupe did not compete and instead joined the 1st Lipton Cheering Cup Competition. Also in that year, UP established a new pep squad, called UP Varsity Pep Squad, as its official delegate to the competition to replace the UP Filipiniana Dance Troupe.

The rivalry between the two squads began in 1999 when UST returned to reclaim the title after their year of absence. However, they only finished second behind UP Pep Squad. In 2001, UP Pep Squad matched the record of UST's three consecutive wins.

In 2002, UST Salinggawi Dance Troupe regained the title while UP Pep Squad finished third. The next three years had UST Salinggawi Dance Troupe in first place and UP Pep Squad as runner-up. In 2006, UST Salinggawi Dance Troupe received their eighth title via five consecutive victories setting the highest score in the history of the competition while UP Pep Squad finished third on that year.

UP Pep Squad regained the title in 2007 and garnered their fifth title in 2008, with UST as second placer. The UP Pep Squad's goal of a second three-peat was not realized in 2009. In that year, UST failed to enter top three for the first time. In 2010, UP regained the title while UST came back in the podium finishing third. UP had another three-peat after winning the 2011 and 2012 editions - the same years when UST failed to enter top three again.

Neither UP nor UST won the cheerdance tilt in from 2013 to 2015. In 2013, UST had its lowest ranking and settled seventh place. As of 2013, UP never placed outside top three while UST failed to get a podium ranking four times in five years.

In 2014, UST successfully rejoined the podium finish at third place while UP placed second. In 2015, after nine years, UST defeated UP by winning second place while UP settled for third. As of 2015, both teams have identical number of championship titles at eight. UP, despite being dethroned, is by far the most established team for having stayed at the podium for 20 years straight.

In the 2017 edition, UP returned from a one-year hiatus but failed to enter the top three.  The UP Pep Squad placed 6th with perennial rivals UST Salinggawi Dance Troupe placing second. Both schools, however, did not make podium finishes in the same event since 2018.

Rise of the underdogs

In 2013, the National U Pep Squad claimed its first ever championship with an Arabian theme. The UAAP CDC was no longer about the triumvirate namely the FEU Cheering Squad, UST Salinggawi Dance Troupe and UP Varsity Pep Squad which were champions in the previous years. A year later The National U Pep Squad successfully clinched a back to back and furthermore a three-peat in 2015, being the third team to claim a three-peat in the CDC given some controversies. Despite the controversies the National U Pep Squad brought back a four-peat championship in the UAAP CDC with a futuristic theme in 2016 being the second squad to claim a four-peat beside UST Salinggawi Dance Troupe. Unfortunately, in the year 2017 they were not able to clinch a five-peat championship nor enter the top 3 due to low dance scores.

In 2017 the Adamson Pep Squad was crowned the champions with the hashtag 80's for 80. This proved that the underdogs could rise to the challenge of the former champions with the top three of that year containing former underdogs UE Pep Squad as bronze medalist and Adamson Pep Squad as gold medalist. The UST Salinggawi Dance Troupe were the silver medalists of that year. Meanwhile, traditional power houses National U Pep Squad, UP Varsity Pep Squad and FEU Cheering Squad were out of the top 3.

In 2018 the National U Pep Squad had its comeback with a 5th Championship in just 6 years. Trailing back are the FEU Cheering Squad with a 70's Funk Theme as the first runner up and 2017 Gold Medalists Adamson Pep Squad with a Lion King theme, being their third straight year at the podium and landing the second runner up for 2018. Scores for the third runner up, UST Salinggawi Dance Troupe were close at a 0.5 margin from the second runner up. 2018 was also the year that the Ateneo Blue Babble Battalion was ranked 7th among all the teams. This was a first for the Blue Babble in 5 years.

In 2019 the National U Pep Squad added 1 more championship up its sleeve getting that 6th Gold Medal finish since 2013. The 2019 CDC edition is known to be the year where each team went out of their own comfort zones, did death defying stunts, difficult and complicated mountings and dismounts of their pyramid, and very synchronized choreography throughout their respective performances. In the end the scores of the 2019 UAAP Cheerdance Competition garnered the highest average of scores since 2012, despite the exact same ranking as the 2018th edition . First runner up, FEU Cheering Squad, comes close with a Michael Jackson Inspired Theme and brought back the Moonwalk stunt previously done in 2009 by the Ateneo Blue Babble Battalion. Second runner up, Adamson Pep Squad, wowed the crowd with a Caribbean-Disco inspired theme. Although the ADU Pep Squad's Last Pyramid (the Caribbean) was not complete they still had a clean run throughout their performance. Thus getting a higher score than the cleaner routines of the 4th placer (UST Salinggawi Dance Troupe) and 5th placer (UE Pep Squad) respectively. The scores for the 2nd, 3rd and 4th runner up were very close. at margins of 1.06 and 0.62.

UP vs NU

Questions were raised on the results of the 2015 Cheerdance Competition after NU Pep Squad won despite committing multiple errors including falls on their lifts and pyramids. This is in contrast with runners-up UP and UST executing clean programs. The UAAP community in the social media was outraged mainly due to their disbelief of the ranking and allegations of biased judging and corruption. NU claimed that their stunts have higher degree of difficulty compared to other teams. Due to this, UP filed an official complaint for the case detailing several judging inaccuracies but was remained unresolved with UAAP officials. In a statement released on UP Pep Squad’s official Facebook account on Wednesday, the state university said that they are pulling out of this year’s competition.

“Regretfully, we will not be part of this season’s UAAP Cheerdance Competition,” the statement said.

After a third place finish in last year’s CDC, the UP Pep Squad filed an official protest questioning the result of the contest. National University successfully defended its crown a year ago while University of Santo Tomas took the second spot.

“From our first request for an informal meeting, to the letter of protest advised by the organizers themselves, we have exhausted all our efforts to reach a resolution. We have repeatedly sought out the delegated individuals to no avail. And after many weeks, months, and now a year of waiting, our issues and questions remain unresolved,” the statement added.

“Reared in the institution we represent, we abide with our principles of honor and integrity, and stay true to our word of foregoing with the competition, should the same organizers be hired to handle the event again.” As a response to the unresolved issues and to focus on international competitions, UP Pep Squad decided to skip the 2016 competition.Since then UP never landed in top 5 after that.

See also
 UAAP Street Dance Competition
 NCAA Cheerleading Competition
 List of domestic club championship attendance: UAAP Cheerdance Competition in a global context.
 UP–UST rivalry

References

External links
 UAAP Official site cheerdancing coverage

Cheerdance
Cheerleading competitions
1994 establishments in the Philippines